Manabu Miyazaki (宮崎学, Miyazaki Manabu), born in Nagano Prefecture in 1949, is a Japanese wildlife photographer.

His work Fukurō / Ural Owl won the Domon Ken Award in 1990. In 1996 two of his books won the Kodansha Publishing Culture Award for a work of photography.

Notes

External links
  Gallery
  Profile
  Official website
  J'Lit | Authors : Manabu Miyazaki | Books from Japan

1949 births
Living people
Japanese photographers